Groote Eylandt Airport  is an airport serving Groote Eylandt, an island in the Gulf of Carpentaria in Northern Territory, Australia. The airport is operated by the Groote Eylandt Mining Co. and is located north of the community of Angurugu.

Facilities

Airlines and destinations

See also
 List of airports in the Northern Territory

References

External links 
 

Airports in the Northern Territory
Groote Eylandt